Devil Red is a crime mystery novel written by American author Joe R. Lansdale. It is the ninth novel in Lansdale's Hap and Leonard series.

Plot summary
In this story Hap Collins and Leonard Pine are hired by a former police officer turned private investigator to investigate a cold case double homicide. As they get further into the investigation, they encounter The Dixie Mafia organized crime syndicate, a vampire cult, and a deadly assassin, Devil Red.

Editions

This book was originally published by Alfred A. Knopf Publications as a trade hardcover in 2011 and was re-issued as a trade paperback by Vintage Crime/Black Lizard in 2012.

References

External links
 Author's official website
 Publishers Website
 Vintage Crime/Black Lizard Website
 Video of Joe reading the 1st chapter

Novels by Joe R. Lansdale
American crime novels

2011 American novels
Novels set in Texas
Alfred A. Knopf books
Works by Joe R. Lansdale